Blacos is a municipality located in the province of Soria, Castile and León, Spain. According to the Municipal Register of Spain, in 2018 the municipality had a population of 44.

References

Municipalities in the Province of Soria